Goodyear Television Playhouse is an American anthology series that was telecast live on NBC from 1951 to 1957 during the first Golden Age of Television.

Sponsored by Goodyear, Goodyear alternated sponsorship with Philco, and the Philco Television Playhouse was seen on alternate weeks.  In October 1955, Alcoa took over alternating sponsorship from Philco, the title was shortened to The Goodyear Playhouse and it aired on alternate weeks with The Alcoa Hour.

Producer Fred Coe nurtured and encouraged a group of young, mostly unknown writers that included Robert Alan Aurthur, George Baxt, Paddy Chayefsky, Horton Foote, Howard Richardson, Tad Mosel and Gore Vidal. Notable productions included Vidal's Visit to a Small Planet (1955), Richardson's Ark of Safety and Chayefsky's The Catered Affair.

From 1957 to 1960, it became a taped, half-hour series titled Goodyear Theater, seen on Mondays at 9:30 p.m.

Goodyear Television Playhouse finished #16 in the Nielsen ratings for the 1951–1952 season, #15 for 1952–1953 and #22 for 1953–1954.

Episodes

Season 1 (1951–52)

Season 2 (1952–53)

Season 3 (1953–54)

Season 4 (1954–55)

Season 5 (1955–56)

Notable guest stars

Eddie Albert
Don Ameche
Jean-Pierre Aumont
Ed Begly
Ralph Bellamy
William Bendix
Shelley Berman
Theodore Bikel
Claire Bloom
Beulah Bondi
Ernest Borgnine
Eddie Bracken
Lloyd Bridges
Pat Carroll (actress)
John Cassavetes
Lee J. Cobb
Hume Cronyn
Don DeFore
Melvyn Douglas
Mildred Dunnock
Bill Erwin
Gracie Fields
Geraldine Fitzgerald
John Forsythe
Anthony Franciosa
Eva Gabor
Larry Hagman
Margaret Hamilton
Julie Harris
Eileen Heckart
Judy Holliday
Celeste Holm
Grace Kelly
Phyllis Kirk
Jack Klugman
Veronica Lake
Viveca Lindfors
June Lockhart
Jack Lord
E.G. Marshall
Nan Martin
Raymond Massey
Walter Matthau
Roddy McDowell
Steve McQueen
Sal Mineo
Mildred Natwick
Patricia Neal
Paul Newman
Leslie Nielsen
Anthony Perkins
Robert Preston (actor)
Tony Randall
Thelma Ritter
Jason Robards
Gena Rowlands
Eva Marie Saint
Martha Scott
William Shatner
Lilia Skala
Kim Stanley
Maureen Stapleton
Rod Steiger
Susan Strasberg
Elaine Stritch
Jessica Tandy
Eli Wallach
Tuesday Weld
Joanne Woodward
Dick York

References

External links
Goodyear Television Playhouse at CVTA with episode list

1951 American television series debuts
1957 American television series endings
1950s American anthology television series
1950s American drama television series
American live television series
Black-and-white American television shows
English-language television shows
Goodyear Tire and Rubber Company
NBC original programming
Works by John Secondari